The 1902 Virginia Orange and Blue football team represented the University of Virginia  the 1902 college football season. Led by John de Saulles in his first and only season as head coach, the team compiled a record of 8–1–1 and claims a Southern championship.

Schedule

Honors and awards
 All-Southern: Thomas Bronston, Henry Johnson, Walter Council, John Pollard.

References

Virginia
Virginia Cavaliers football seasons
Virginia Orange and Blue football